Weedon railway station was located to the north of Weedon Bec in Northamptonshire, England on the West Coast Main Line. It was a junction station, being the starting point of the Weedon to Leamington Spa branch line, with one bay platform dedicated for terminating branch line trains.

History
The station also housed a busy goods depot which was attacked by German aircraft during World War II.

Accidents and incidents

Two serious derailments occurred south of the station in 1915 and 1951, killing 10 and 15 people respectively.

Future
Transport advocacy group Sustainable Transport Midlands is campaigning for a new parkway station to be built in Weedon to serve Daventry. In an interview with BBC News, Councillor Phil Larratt, West Northamptonshire Council cabinet member for Transport said 'West Northamptonshire Council supported new stations and a new facility at Weedon could "serve all the villages and communities between Daventry, Northampton and Towcester"'

Routes

References

General

External links 

 Weedon station on navigable 1954 O. S. map
 Photograph of Weedon station - Flickr.com

West Northamptonshire District
Disused railway stations in Northamptonshire
Former London and Birmingham Railway stations
Railway stations in Great Britain opened in 1838
Railway stations in Great Britain closed in 1958